Nathong Airport  is a domestic airport that serves Xam Neua, the capital of Houaphan Province, Laos.

Airlines and destinations

Accidents and incidents
 On October 19, 2000, Lao Aviation Flight 703 was crashed into the mountains near Nathong Airport, Xam Neua. 8 passengers died while 9 passengers and crews survived, but suffered injuries.

References

Airports in Laos